Bracknell & Wokingham College is a general college of further education, offering courses for school leavers, adults and employers training their staff, and based in Bracknell, Berkshire, England. The college became Bracknell & Wokingham College in 1996.

Overview 
Established in 1963, the college became Bracknell & Wokingham College in 1996 and today operates out of around 20 centres in the Bracknell Forest and Wokingham District areas. Its modern HQ in Church Road in Bracknell opened in 2009 and caters for students of all ages although it is more common that adult students take evening and weekend courses.

Education 
For school leavers, the college offers a range of A Levels, BTECs, Apprenticeships and many more vocational courses.

Facilities 
The college’s Church Road centre; a £36 million investment, was officially opened by HRH Prince Edward, Earl of Wessex on 29 September 2010.

References

Further education colleges in Berkshire
Educational institutions established in 1993
Education in Bracknell Forest
Education in the Borough of Wokingham
1993 establishments in England